The School of the Holy Child, Angeles, Inc.(SHCAI) also known as Holy Child, is a privately owned Catholic independent pre-elementary, elementary and high-school campus from ages 3 (Nursery) to 17 Senior Year). It was founded by  Mr. and Mrs. Pablo Kabigting. It is currently located at 101 George Ave. Villa, Angelina Subd., Angeles.

Although SHCAI is a Catholic, Non-Sectarian, Independent School, it also houses members and practitioners of other religions.

The school is recognized in pre-elementary, elementary, high-school levels by the Department of Education Region III. A member of the Angeles City Association of Private Schools (ACAPS) and Association of Private Pre- elementary and Elementary Administrators of Region III. The institution is known for practicing high caliber education and promoting Christian formation.

References

Catholic elementary schools in the Philippines
Catholic secondary schools in the Philippines
Schools in Angeles City
Educational institutions established in 1985
1985 establishments in the Philippines